Herrljunga is a locality and the seat of Herrljunga Municipality, Västra Götaland County, Sweden. It had 3,822 inhabitants in 2010.

Overview 
The town grew up around a railway junction. From 1906 it had the status of a municipalsamhälle (a form of borough) within the rural municipality, also called Herrljunga. Today it is the seat of the much larger Herrljunga Municipality.

Herrljunga is known for Herrljunga Cider, that as of 2005 had the largest market share of cider in daily stores in Sweden with 16%. It's also known for its large railway connection, connecting Västra stambanan, a railway connection between the two largest Swedish cities, Göteborg and Stockholm.

References 

Populated places in Västra Götaland County
Populated places in Herrljunga Municipality
Municipal seats of Västra Götaland County
Swedish municipal seats